Craspedoporus is a genus of diatoms known from the fossil record. It first appears in the middle Eocene, and exists until the late Miocene.

References

External links 
 Craspedoporus at AlgaeBase

†
Enigmatic algae taxa
Enigmatic bikont taxa
Bacillariophyceae